The 1934 Lafayette Leopards football team was an American football team that represented Lafayette College in the Middle Three Conference during the 1934 college football season. In its 11th season under head coach Herb McCracken, the team compiled a 2–6 record. Charles Nesi was the team captain.

Schedule

References

Lafayette
Lafayette Leopards football seasons
Lafayette Leopards football